Eddie Perez is an American director, stunt coordinator and actor. He is a three-time Primetime Emmy Award winner for Shameless.

Life and career

Eddie was born in New York City, New York. He graduated from Long Island University, had worked as a doorman in New York City, and then moved to Los Angeles to work as a personal trainer for Mickey Rourke and Anthony Michael Hall. He worked as a bodyguard for Duran Duran, Sylvester Stallone, and Sandra Bullock. Later, he studied acting with Peter Flood and stunts with Paul Stader. He was the second unit director and stunt coordinator in the films such as Blade and Shoot 'Em Up.

Eddie has stunt coordinated Shameless for 9 seasons. In 2015, he directed the short film, The Test of Time. His notable acting works include Westworld, Once Upon a Time in Hollywood, Deadpool, Sicario, and Jack Reacher.

Selected filmography

As stunt coordinator

 2022 – Daisy Jones & The Six
 2022 – Promised Land
 2019-2022 – Snowfall
 2013-2021 – Shameless
 2019 – Zeroville
 2019 – Perpetual Grace, LTD
 2017 – Rhett & Link's Buddy System
 2016 – Max Rose
 2016 – So B. It
 2015 – Hardcore Henry
 2014 – Blood Ransom
 2013 – Masters of Sex
 2011 – Chemistry
 2011 – In Plain Sight
 2008 – Sex Drive
 2008 – While She Was Out
 2007 – Shoot 'Em Up
 2006 – Idiocracy
 2005-2006 – Threshold

 2004-2006 – Phil of the Future
 2004 – Blade: Trinity
 1999-2004 – The Jersey
 2003 – The League of Extraordinary Gentlemen
 2002 – Curb Your Enthusiasm
 2002 – 100 Deeds for Eddie McDowd
 2002 – Zig Zag
 2002 – Crossroads
 2001 – Human Nature
 2001 – Special Unit 2
 2000 – Mexico City
 2000 – Just Deal
 1999 – Forever Fabulous
 1998 – Permanent Midnight
 1997 – Hugo Pool
 1997 – American Perfekt
 1994 – Hail Caesar
 1993 – Mi Vida Loca

Awards and nominations

References

External links
 
 

Living people
American film directors
American male film actors
American stunt performers
Stunt doubles
Year of birth missing (living people)